Jawani may refer to:

 Jawani, Ghana, a community in Ghana
 Jawani (film), a 1942 Bollywood film

See also
 Jawaani, a 1984 Indian Hindi-language film
 Jawani Diwani: A Youthful Joyride, 2006 Hindi film
 Jawani Diwani, a 1972 Hindi musical romance film